Bloody Thursday, Thursday Massacre or Thursday Night Massacre may refer to:

 "Bloody Thursday", on March 28, 1918, during the Battle of Tampere
 "Bloody Thursday" on July 5, 1934, during the 1934 West Coast waterfront strike in the United States
 The Chiquola Mill Massacre, on September 6, 1934, during the 1934 textile workers' strike in the eastern United States
 The Kossuth Tér Massacre, on October 25, 1956, during the Hungarian Revolution
 The 2017 storming of the Macedonian Parliament, on April 27, 2017, was dubbed "Bloody Thursday". 
 "Bloody Thursday", on May 15, 1969, during protests at People's Park in Berkeley, California
 "Bloody Thursday", on February 17, 2011, during the fourth day of the Bahraini uprising
 "Thursday Night Massacre", a name for the December 2022 Twitter suspensions

See also
 Black Thursday (disambiguation)